James Tilghman Lloyd (August 28, 1857 – April 3, 1944) was a Democratic member of the U.S. House of Representatives from Missouri from 1897 to 1917. He served as the House minority whip between 1901 and 1909.

Lloyd was born in Canton, Missouri, where he attended the public schools, and later graduated from Christian University (today Culver-Stockton College) in Canton. He taught school, was a deputy sheriff of Lewis County from  1879 to 1881, and deputy circuit clerk and recorder from 1880 to 1882. He studied law, was admitted to the bar in 1882, and started a practice in Monticello, before moving to Shelbyville in 1885. He was prosecuting attorney of Shelby County from 1889 to 1893.

Lloyd was elected as a Democrat to the Fifty-fifth Congress in a special election caused by the death of Representative-elect Richard P. Giles, and was reelected nine additional times. In Congress, he served as Democratic whip in the Fifty-seventh through Sixtieth Congresses, and chairman of the Committee on Accounts in the Sixty-second through Sixty-fourth Congresses. In 1916, he led the effort to pass the Lloyd–La Follette Act to provide federal employees with whistleblower protections. In party politics, he was a delegate to the 1908 Democratic National Convention, and served as chairman of the Democratic Congressional Campaign Committee from 1909 to 1913, during which time his party gained a majority in the House of Representatives.

After retiring from Congress in 1917, Lloyd remained in Washington, D.C. where he practiced law. He was president of the board of education in 1924 and 1925 and president of the chamber of commerce in 1925. He returned to Canton in 1925 and continued his law practice and was a member of the board of curators of Culver-Stockton College. He died in Quincy, Illinois on April 3, 1944, and was buried in Forest Grove Cemetery in Canton.

References

External links

1857 births
1944 deaths
People from Canton, Missouri
People from Shelby County, Missouri
Missouri lawyers
Members of the District of Columbia Board of Education
American deputy sheriffs
American people of Welsh descent
American prosecutors
Culver–Stockton College alumni
Democratic Party members of the United States House of Representatives from Missouri